Jeff Wharton is a Canadian politician and member of the Legislative Assembly of Manitoba for Red River North, currently serving as the Minister of Economic Development, Investment and Trade. A member of the Progressive Conservative Party of Manitoba, he was first elected in the 2016 provincial election as MLA for Gimli, and re-elected in 2019 as MLA for Red River North.

Wharton initially ran as the Progressive Conservative candidate for Gimli in the 2011 provincial election, but lost to incumbent NDP MLA Peter Bjornson. When Bjornson retired in 2015, Wharton ran and was elected MLA for Gimli in the 2016 Manitoba election.

On August 17, 2017, Premier Brian Pallister appointed Wharton as Minister of Municipal Relations.

Following electoral boundary changes implemented in 2019, Gimli was dissolved and Wharton successfully sought election in the new constituency of Red River North.

Wharton was appointed Minister of Crown Services on September 26, 2019.

References

Living people
Members of the Executive Council of Manitoba
Progressive Conservative Party of Manitoba MLAs
21st-century Canadian politicians
Year of birth missing (living people)